Coal Black may refer to:
The color black
"Coal Black Rose", an American folk song
Coal Black and de Sebben Dwarfs, a 1943 Warner Brothers cartoon infamous for its racial stereotypes